Vahan Terian (February 9, 1885 – January 7, 1920) was an Armenian  poet, lyrist and public activist. He is known for his sorrowful, romantic poems, the most famous of which are still read and sung in their musical versions.

Biography 

Terian was born in the Gandza village (განძანი) of Javakheti region of Georgia (then in Russian Empire).  Schooled in Tiflis, he then studied at the Lazarian College in Moscow, where he was exposed to symbolism and joined the Russian Social Democrats.  He was jailed by Czarist police for his political activity.
He is mostly known for his poems dedicated to autumn and love. That's why Teryan is known as "Singer of Autumn" in Literature. He published his first book of poems, "Dreams at Dusk", in 1908, which made him an immediate sensation, Hovhannes Tumanian calling him the most original lyric poet of his age.  He later published "Night Remembrance", "The Golden Legend", "The Return", "The Golden Link", "In the Land of Nairi" (where he substitute the word 'Nairi' for each instance where the word 'Armenia' would have suited), and "The Cat's Paradise".  His poems are filled with images of rain, mist, pallid fields and shapeless shadows, symbols of sorrow, despair and eventually, peace.

In 1913, Terian left Moscow University for the University of St. Petersburg, where he majored in oriental languages, intensifying his political involvement.  After the revolution he became representative of Armenians in the Ministry of Nations, personally working with Lenin and Stalin. In 1916, Vahan Terian published a collection of poems entitled Land of Nairi (in Armenian:  (Yerkir Nairi), in which he uses Nairi in place of Armenia. Likewise in 1923, Yeghishe Charents wrote a satirical novella entitled Land of Nairi, using once again Nairi as a synonym for Armenia. Hayastan Yeghiazarian used Nairi Zarian as his pen name, replacing his first name, Hayastan (which is what Armenians call Armenia in their own language) with Nairi.

He died in Orenburg of tuberculosis shortly before his 35th birthday.  He was buried there and the grave had been marked by a wooden cross, which was quickly forgotten and the exact spot lost. In 1964 soil from the Orenburg cemetery was brought to Yerevan by Terian's daughter and buried in the Komitas Pantheon with a cenotaph was placed.

Each year there is a commemoration of his life in Javakhk region at Gandza village where he was born.

Works in Armenian
1903-12, ՄԹՆՇԱՂԻ ԱՆՈՒՐՋՆԵՐ (Dreams of The Dawn)
1905-1908, ՓՇԵ ՊՍԱԿ (Crown of Thorn)
1908-1911, ԳԻՇԵՐ ԵՎ ՀՈՒՇԵՐ (Night and Reminiscences)
1908-1911, ՈՍԿԻ ՀԵՔԻԱԹ (Golden Tale)
1911, ՎԵՐԱԴԱՐՁ (Return)

Works in Russian

1903-12, ГРЕЗЫ СУМЕРЕК (Dreams of The Dawn)
1903-12, ТЕРНОВЫЙ ВЕНЕЦ (Crown of Thorn)
1908-11, НОЧЬ И ВОСПОМИНАНИЯ (Night and Reminiscences)
1908-11, ЗОЛОТАЯ СКАЗКА (Golden Tale)
1911, ВОЗВРАЩЕНИЕ(Return)
1912-19 ЗОЛОТАЯ ЦЕПЬ (Golden Chain)
1917 КОШАЧИЙ РАЙ (Cat Heaven)
1917-19, ПЕСНИ СВОБОДЫ (Songs of Freedom)
1912-19, СТРАНА НАИРИ (Land of Nairi)
1913-19, РАЗНЫЕ СТИХОТВОРЕНИЯ (Misc. Poems)

References

 Days of Terian Celebrated in Javakhk

External links
 'Vahan Teryan's poems'
 Vahan Teryan's works
 Mtnshaghi Anurjner (1903-1908)
 Vahan Teryan's poems

Armenian activists
20th-century Armenian poets
1875 births
1920 deaths
People from Tiflis Governorate
People from Samtskhe–Javakheti
20th-century deaths from tuberculosis
Soviet Armenians
Burials at the Komitas Pantheon
Armenian male poets
20th-century male writers
Tuberculosis deaths in the Soviet Union
Tuberculosis deaths in Russia
Poets from the Russian Empire